Stanislav Ivanovich Stepashkin (1 September 1940 – 4 September 2013) was an Olympic boxer from the Soviet Union.

Born in Moscow, Stepashkin trained at Trudovye Rezervy until 1963 and then at the Armed Forces sports society. He became the Honoured Master of Sports of the USSR in 1964 and was awarded the Order of the Badge of Honor in the following year. He competed at the 1964 Tokyo Olympics in the Featherweight (-57 kg) division winning the gold medal. During his career Stepashkin won 193 fights out of 204. He graduated from the State Order of Lenin Central Institute of Physical Education.

1964 Olympic results 
Below is the record of Stanislav Stepashkin, a featherweight boxer from the Soviet Union who competed at the 1964 Tokyo Olympics:

Round of 32: Defeated Jose Nieves (Puerto Rico) referee stopped contest
Round of 16: Defeated Hsu Hung Chen (Republic of China) referee stopped contest
Quarterfinal: Defeated Constantin Crudu (Romania) referee stopped contest in the third round
Semifinal: Defeated Heinz Schulz (Unified Team of Germany) by knockout
Final: Defeated Anthony Villanueva (Philippines) by decision, 3-2 (won gold medal)

References

External links
Olympic profile

1940 births
2013 deaths
Martial artists from Moscow
Honoured Masters of Sport of the USSR
Soviet male boxers
Boxers at the 1964 Summer Olympics
Olympic boxers of the Soviet Union
Armed Forces sports society athletes
Olympic medalists in boxing
Russian male boxers
Medalists at the 1964 Summer Olympics
Olympic gold medalists for the Soviet Union
Featherweight boxers
Russian State University of Physical Education, Sport, Youth and Tourism alumni